The University of Vicenza was a medieval university located in the town of Vicenza in the Veneto region of Italy. It was recognized as a studium generale in 1204.

The university was first formed by students migrating from the University of Bologna; Hastings Rashdall suggests a number of universities were formed the same way during the first decade of the 13th century. The university closed in 1209.

See also 
 List of medieval universities

References

External links
https://web.archive.org/web/20051123235128/http://www.csu.vi.it/

Vicenza

it:Vicenza#Università